William Lee (27 September 1875 – 21 September 1948) was an Irish-born prelate of the Roman Catholic Church. He served as Bishop of Clifton from 1931 to 1948.

Born in Mitchelstown, County Cork on 27 September 1875, he was educated at St. Colman's College, Fermoy and at the seminaries of St. John's College, Waterford and St Mary's College, Oscott. He was ordained to the priesthood on 2 March 1901. He was appointed the Bishop of the Diocese of Clifton by the Holy See on 18 December 1931. His consecration to the Episcopate took place on 26 January 1932, the principal consecrator was Archbishop Thomas Leighton Williams of Birmingham, and the principal co-consecrators were Bishop Francis John Vaughan of Menevia and Bishop John Patrick Barrett of Plymouth.

He died in office on 21 September 1948, aged 73.

References

1875 births
1948 deaths
20th-century Roman Catholic bishops in England
Irish expatriate Catholic bishops
Irish emigrants to the United Kingdom
People from County Cork
Alumni of St John's College, Waterford
Alumni of St Mary's College, Oscott
Roman Catholic bishops of Clifton